Drepana pallida is a moth of the family Drepanidae first described by Frederic Moore in 1879. It is found in south-east Asia, from northern India and Myanmar to Vietnam, mainland China and Taiwan.

The length of the forewings is 19–22 mm for males and about 22 mm for females. Adults are pale brown, the forewings with traces of several antemedial lines and a dark spot at the end of the cell. There is an oblique fulvous band from near the apex to the inner margin beyond the middle, slightly bent near the inner margin. There is a series of indistinct submarginal dark specks. The hindwings are similar, but the fulvous band is curved.

The larvae feed on the leaves of Alnus formosana. Last instar larvae rest on the lower surface of leaves, more exposed than earlier instars. They firmly interlace leaves together with strong silk and thus construct a pupation site between the leaves.

Subspecies
Drepana pallida pallida (north-eastern India, northern Myanmar)
Drepana pallida cretacea Hampson, 1914 (China: Sichuan, Vietnam)
Drepana pallida flexuosa Watson, 1968 (China: Fujian, Zhejiang)
Drepana pallida nicromaculata Okano, 1959 (Taiwan)

References

Moths described in 1879
Drepaninae